Helen Shaver (born February 24, 1951)  is a Canadian actress and film and television director. She has received Emmy and Saturn Award nominations, among other honours.

Early life
Shaver was born and raised, with five sisters, in St. Thomas, Ontario, Canada, a small city located near London, Ontario. As a child, she suffered from chronic rheumatic fever and, between the ages of five and twelve, was forced to spend six months of each year in bed or in hospitals, which she said fostered her introspective side. She attended the Banff School of Fine Arts as a teenager and studied acting at the University of Victoria in British Columbia.

Career
After roles in such Canadian features as Outrageous! (1977), Starship Invasions (1977), Who Has Seen the Wind (1977) and High Ballin (1978), Shaver won a Canadian Film Award as Best Lead Actress opposite Tom Berenger (for her performance as "Ann MacDonald") in In Praise of Older Women (1978).

Shaver was one of the stars of director Sam Peckinpah's final film, 1983's The Osterman Weekend. In 1985, Shaver starred in Desert Hearts as a 1950s university professor who falls in love with another woman. Her performance, with co-star Patricia Charbonneau, drew critical praise and Shaver won the Bronze Leopard Award at the Locarno International Film Festival. Another prominent film performance during that time came in 1986 as the love interest of Paul Newman in his Oscar-winning portrayal of "Fast" Eddie Felson in Scorsese's The Color of Money, a sequel to 1961's The Hustler.

In 1980, Shaver starred with Beau Bridges in the short-lived NBC TV series United States developed by Larry Gelbart. A year later she starred in the short-lived drama series Jessica Novak. She was in the 1984 Canadian-made Countdown to Looking Glass. She subsequently appeared on such television shows as Hill Street Blues and T. J. Hooker. In 1990, she guest-starred as the murderer in Rest in Peace, Mrs. Columbo, and later that year co-starred on the short-lived series WIOU, playing a television journalist (as she also did on Jessica Novak). From 1996-1999, Shaver co-starred on the TV series Poltergeist: The Legacy,  playing Dr. Rachel Corrigan, a widowed psychiatrist with an eight-year-old daughter who is helped by the Legacy in the pilot episode; her performance earned a Saturn Award nomination. In 2000, she won a Genie Award for her portrayal of a drug-addicted prostitute in the independent feature We All Fall Down.

Shaver made her feature-length directorial debut in 1999 with the television film Summer's End, which won an Emmy and earned her a directorial nomination.  Shaver has also directed a number of television shows and cable movies, including The Outer Limits, Judging Amy, Joan of Arcadia, Medium, The OC, Law & Order: Special Victims Unit, The L Word, Jericho, Journeyman, Private Practice, The Unit, Crusoe, Orphan Black, Vikings (2013 TV series), 13 Reasons Why, and Westworld. In 2003 she won a Gemini award for Best Direction in a Dramatic Series for the Just Cause television series episode "Death's Details".

In 2004, Shaver was inducted into Canada's Walk of Fame.

Happy Place, her first theatrical feature film after directing for television, premiered at the Cinéfest Sudbury International Film Festival, and was screened at the 2020 Vancouver International Film Festival.

In 2021, Shaver picked up The Living Legend Tribute at the 23rd Women's Image Network Awards with fellow honoree JoJo Siwa its Rising Musical Star recipient.

In 2023, Shaver won the DGA award for directing episode 8 ("Who's There?") of Station Eleven.

Personal life
Shaver dated screenwriter Stephen C. Peters, and is now married to Steve Smith, the key grip she met during the filming of Desert Hearts. They have a son, Mackenzie.

Filmography

Film

Television

Director

References

External links

Canadian Film Encyclopedia: A publication of The Film Reference Library/a division of the Toronto International Film Festival Group

1951 births
Actresses from Ontario
Canadian film actresses
Film directors from Ontario
Film producers from Ontario
Canadian television actresses
Canadian television directors
Canadian women film directors
Canadian voice actresses
Canadian women television directors
Best Supporting Actress Genie and Canadian Screen Award winners
Living people
People from St. Thomas, Ontario
University of Victoria alumni
20th-century Canadian actresses
21st-century Canadian actresses
Best Actress Genie and Canadian Screen Award winners
Canadian women film producers